Donghai Island (Tunghai) is an island in the southeast part of the urban area of Zhanjiang, Guangdong, People's Republic of China. In 2008, it had a population of around 160,000.

See also

 Naozhou Island
 List of islands of the People's Republic of China

References

Islands of Guangdong
Zhanjiang